9 is a 2021 Uruguayan-Argentine sports drama film written and directed by Martín Barrenechea & Nicolás Branca (in their directorial debuts). It stars Enzo Vogrincic, Rafael Spregelburd, Horacio Camandulle, Rogelio Gracia, Roxana Blanco, Lara Sofía, Santiago Sanguinetti. The film won Best International Film at the 8th National Film Awards. Also, it was considered by Uruguay's Instituto Nacional del Cine y el Audiovisual Uruguayo for the Uruguayan selection for the Best International Feature Film at the 95th Academy Awards, but it was not chosen.

Synopsis 
Christian Arias is a successful football player who, at the age of 23, projects himself as a great figure in world soccer. He lives isolated in a luxurious and solitary environment, besieged by fans, pressured by the press and sentenced to fulfill commitments set by his parents, who also act as their representative. Christian feels for the first time the need to escape.

Cast 
The actors participating in this film are:

 Rafael Spregelburd as Óscar
 Enzo Vogrincic as Christian
 Horacio Camandulle as Wilmer
 Rogelio Gracia as Damián
 Roxana Blanco as Dr. Gutman
 Lara Sofía as Belén
 Santiago Sanguinetti as Gabriel

Release 
The film premiered on November 12, 2021 in the Official Section of the 47th Huelva Ibero-American Film Festival. It had its commercial premiere in Uruguayan movie theaters on July 7, 2022.

References

External links 

 

2021 films
2021 drama films
Uruguayan drama films
Argentine drama films
2020s Spanish-language films

2020s Argentine films
Films set in Uruguay
Films shot in Uruguay
Films about sportspeople
2021 directorial debut films